Singanalluru Puttaswamayya Varadaraj (also known as S. P. Varadappa, 1935 – 8 February 2006) was an Indian actor and producer in Kannada cinema. He produced films such as Bhootayyana Maga Ayyu starring Lokesh, and Hemavathi starring Udaykumar.

He was an architect in shaping up Sri Vajreshwari Combines, one of the most successful banners in the Kannada film industry, under which his sister-in-law Parvathamma Rajkumar produced films starring his brother Rajkumar, and his sons Shiv RajKumar, Raghavendra Rajkumar, and Puneeth Rajkumar.

Biography

He was born at Gajanur – situated in the Karnataka–Tamil Nadu border – to Singanalluru Puttaswamayya, a theatre-artist, and Lakshmamma as a  third child; Rajkumar, a Kannada film icon, is his elder brother while Sharadamma and Nagamma) are  his sisters.

He began his career as an actor part of Gubbi company (drama troupe) along with his father, elder brother – S.P. Muthuraj – popularly known as Rajkumar – and his younger sister. Later, he acted in couple of movies as a child artist in Makaranda and Krishnaleela. As an adult, he played minor roles in Kannada movies such as  Sarvagnamoorthy released in 1965, Satishakti, and Dharma Vijaya released in 1959, in which his brother Rajkumar played a lead role. He produced Bhootayyana Maga Aiyyu and Hemavathi movies along with his friend – Chandulal Jain.

Varadappa[Varadaraj], after the success of Bedara Kannappa – starring Rajkumar – he stood behind his brother and his family when they settled in Chennai – then Madras; He remained a most trusted guide and friend to Rajkumar to the extent of his involvement in selection of stories for home productions – Vajreshwari Combines. It is believed that without the efforts of Varadappa, Kannada filmdom would have missed out a great actor – Rajkumar. It is said that, he was an integral part of Rajkumar and his family, and was responsible for the success of Rajkumar's films along with his sister-in-law Parvathamma Rajkumar.

He died at an age of 71 in Bangalore due to heart ailment on 8 February 2006. An award on his name S.P. Varadaraju Awards has been instituted to honour the theatre personalities annually.

See also
 Rajkumar filmography
 Kannada films of the 1950s

Notes

References

External links
  the efforts of his brother Varadaraju, Kannada filmdom might have missed out on a great actor. It is said that Varadaraju's recent death had created a vacuum in Rajkumar's life. Rajkumar joined his father Singanallur Puttaswamayya and brother Varadappa's (Varadanna as he is called) in performing for a drama troupe.
 DR. RAJKUMAR – Brother :  S.P.Varadaraju – Father : Singanallooru Puttaswamayya – Mother :  Laxmamma
 Biography of Dr. Rajkumar – Annavaru – Family – Rajkumar had a brother S.P.Varadaraju who worked with him in his production company. He also had a sister by name Sharadamma.

People from Erode district
Film producers from Tamil Nadu
Kannada film producers
Male actors in Kannada cinema
1935 births
2006 deaths
Male actors from Tamil Nadu
20th-century Indian male actors
Indian male film actors